Umayya Abu-Hanna (born 17 March 1961) is a Palestinian-Finnish writer, journalist, and former member of the Helsinki City Council born in Haifa, Israel into a Palestinian family. She moved to Finland in 1981. In 2011, she moved to Amsterdam where she resides with her South African daughter.

Career 

In the 1980s, Abu-Hanna was a member of the Helsinki City Council (for the Green Party) and a member of the Real Estate Board of Helsinki. 

In the 1990s, she was a journalist, documentary maker and columnist. She became known to the wider public as the first non-white presenter of the weekly current affairs news-program Ajankohtainen Kakkonen at the Finnish Broadcasting Company YLE. 

In the 2000s, she was member of the Arts Council Finland (2004-2009) and was the first chair of its Multicultural Board. Abu-Hanna was also the cultural diversity adviser of the Finnish National Gallery.

Her first novel, Nurinkurin, was published in 2003. Her book on identity, Sinut, was published in 2007. A manual for the cultural field, Multikulti, was published in 2012. A cultural history of modern Helsinki, Alienin Silmin, was  published in 2014. She co-authored A changing world, perspectives on heritage, with case studies of museums in Afghanistan.

Bibliography 
 Nurinkurin (2003)
 Sinut (2007),
 Multkikulti (2012)
 Alienin silmin (2014)
 A Changing World, perspectives on heritage (2014)
 Columns, Metro
 Columns, Suomen Kuvalehti
 Columns, Helsingin Sanomat
 Columns,  Finnair's in-flight magazine: Blue Wings

Awards 

 Larin Paraske Award, The Kalevala Women's Association (2008)
 "Finn of the Year", The Finnish Civic Society (2004)
 Finland Award (2003), Ministry of Education
 Bonnier Group Award (2002) for journalistic innovation

References

External links
Homepage

1961 births
Living people
Writers from Haifa
20th-century Finnish journalists
Finnish writers
Palestinian emigrants to Finland
Finnish people of Palestinian descent
20th-century Finnish politicians
20th-century Finnish women politicians
Finnish expatriates in the Netherlands
Finnish women journalists
Politicians from Haifa
21st-century Finnish journalists
Aalto University School of Arts, Design and Architecture alumni